George Peter Michael Varah (19 October 1944 – 2 April 2007) was a British international middle-distance runner and later a Chief Probation Officer.

Biography
Varah was eldest of triplet boys born in the vicarage of Holy Trinity, Blackburn to Dr Chad Varah and his wife Susan.  His father was the local Anglican vicar, who founded the Samaritans charity in 1953.  His mother later became world president of the Mothers' Union in the 1970s.

Varah was educated at Raine's Foundation Grammar School for Boys in Stepney and at Loughborough College.  He was an excellent track and field athlete, and captain of the Loughborough College athletics team.  He became a member of the Great Britain athletics team in 1965, and ran the second leg in a 4 x 800m relay that broke the world record at Crystal Palace in 1966. He competed for England in the 1966 British Empire and Commonwealth Games in Kingston, Jamaica and the 1967 Summer Universiade (the Tokyo World Student Games).  At one point, he held the British Indoor Athletics record at 800 metres.

He became Master in Charge of Athletics at Rugby School in 1968.  He also worked as a volunteer tutor at Onley Borstal.  After post-graduate study at Leicester University, he joined the Warwickshire Probation Service in 1973.  He worked as a basic-grade Probation Officer, then ran Community Service in Warwickshire, and then became assistant chief of the West Midlands Probation Service.   He became Chief Probation Officer in Surrey in 1988.  His rise from the lowest grade of Probation Officer to Chief Probation Officer was the fastest in the history of the Probation Service.  He was the longest-serving Chief Officer in the National Probation Service when he retired in 2004, having spent 35 years working in the criminal justice system.

He also worked for many charities.  He and a friend, Jim Higgins (also a probation officer), founded the Rugby Mayday Trust in Warwickshire.  He also founded the independent Surrey Springboard Trust.  He became chairman of Crimestoppers in 2004.  He was a trustee of Samaritans, and of Victim Support.  He also served on employment tribunals from 2005.

He was appointed as a Deputy Lieutenant of Surrey, and had been nominated to serve as High Sheriff of Surrey in 2008–9.

He died of viral double pneumonia.  He was survived by his wife Sally (née Rowat), his father, and a daughter and a son.

References
http://www.timesonline.co.uk/tol/comment/obituaries/article1837119.ece
http://www.guardian.co.uk/otherlives/story/0,,2101398,00.html

1944 births
2007 deaths
Alumni of Loughborough University
People educated at Raine's Foundation School
English male middle-distance runners
Athletes (track and field) at the 1966 British Empire and Commonwealth Games
Commonwealth Games competitors for England
Probation and parole officers